The Pantai Timur Range (Malay: Banjaran Pantai Timur; Jawi: بنجارن ڤنتاي تيمور), also known as the Terengganu Highlands (Malay: Tanah Tinggi Terengganu; Jawi: تانه تيڠڬي ترڠڬانو), is a mountain range situated in the eastern seaboard of Peninsular Malaysia. It is a subrange of the wider Tenasserim Hills system, that defines the backbone of the Malay Peninsula entirely. The Pantai Timur Range covers Gua Musang and Kuala Krai Districts in southeastern Kelantan, the western frontier of Terengganu, and Jerantut and Kuantan Districts in northeastern Pahang.

Several nature reserves are located within the range, such as the Taman Negara and Kenyir Lake, the largest man made lake in Southeast Asia.

Mountain ranges of Malaysia